Sonapah is a village in tehsil Beerwah, district Budgam of the Jammu and Kashmir (India).

Population 
As of the 2011 census, the population of  Sonapah is 3072, of which 1771 are males and 1301 are females. The total number of children below 6 years is 930 as per the report.

Religions

Transport 
The district road (Budgam To Beerwah) passes through the otligam village, and  nearest airport is the Sheikh ul-Alam International Airport.

Educational institutions 
 Govt. MS School Sonapah.
 Govt. PS School Sonapah.
 Alpine Institute of Modern Education Sonapah (AIMES).

References 

Villages in Budgam district